Xixiangtang District is one of 7 districts of the prefecture-level city of Nanning, the capital of Guangxi Zhuang Autonomous Region, South China. The district was approved to establish by merging the former two districts of Yongxin (excluding 10 villages of Jaingxi Town) and Chengbei by the Chinese State Council  on September 15, 2004.

See also 
Nanning Railway Station

References

External links 

County-level divisions of Guangxi
Nanning